Eastern Front may refer to

War fronts:
 Eastern Front (World War I)
 Eastern Front (World War II)
 Eastern Front (Turkey), of the Turkish War of Independence
 Turkish–Armenian War, often referred to by itself as the Eastern Front
 Eastern Front (Sudan)
 Eastern Front of the Russian Civil War
 Eastern Front of the Red Army
 Eastern Front of the Indo-Pakistani war of 1971

Games and books:
 Eastern Front (1941) (video game)
 EastFront, 1991 board wargame
 1635: The Eastern Front (novel)

See also
 Frente Leste, the theater of anti-guerrilla operations for the Portuguese Armed Forces in the East of Angola, during the Portuguese Colonial War (1961–1974)